The Armenian Reform Program of May 11, 1895, was a set of reforms proposed by the European Powers. The program was signed in October 1895 and presented to Sultan Abdul Hamid II. However, this program was never implemented.

See also
Armenian Question
Armenian reform package

References

Citations 

19th century in Armenia
1895 in the Ottoman Empire